The Turkey-EU Joint Parliamentary Committee (JPC) is established on the basis of the European Parliament’s resolution of 14 May 1965 and the resolutions of the Turkish National Assembly and the Turkish Senate, adopted respectively on 22 June and 14 July 1965, and on the basis of the decision of the European Economic Community-Turkey Association Council of 27 July 1965.

General information

The task of the Committee shall be to consider issues related to Turkey's accession process. Within this context, the Committee is entrusted to follow, analyse and evaluate issues related to all existing bilateral arrangements between Turkey and the EU starting with the Association Agreement signed in Ankara on 12 September 1963 between Turkey and the EEC, the decisions of the Association Council as well as the accession negotiations which started on 3 October 2005 at the Turkey-EU Intergovernmental Accession Conference. Furthermore, the Committee is entrusted with strengthening the relations between the Turkish Grand National Assembly and the European Parliament.

The Committee may also consider all issues within the context of the Turkey-EU relations in accordance with the mandate given by the Turkish Grand National Assembly and the European Parliament.

Organization of the JPC

The Committee shall be composed, in equal numbers, of members appointed by the European Parliament and members appointed by the Turkish Grand National Assembly. The Bureau of the Committee shall be composed of the Chairperson of the delegation of the European Parliament, the Chairperson of the delegation of the Turkish Grand National Assembly, and several Vice-Chairpersons of each delegation.

Sessions of the JPC

The Committee shall, in principle, meet three times a year. It shall be convened by the Chairperson-in-office, after consulting the other Chairperson. The notice of the meeting shall include a draft agenda drawn up by the Bureau and shall normally be sent to members a fortnight in advance'. In principle, sessions shall be held by turns in Turkey and in one of the workplaces of the European Parliament.

Meetings of the Committee will be held in public unless the Committee decides otherwise. Members of the Association Council, Members of the European Commission and of the Council of the European Union, and Members of the Government of Turkey as well as any person may, by decision of the Bureau, be invited to attend and speak at a meeting.

The official languages of the Committee shall be the official languages of the European Parliament and the Turkish.

Members of the delegation of the Turkish Grand National Assembly

Members of the delegation of the European Parliament

The secretariat of the Committee

The secretariat of the Committee shall be provided by the secretariat of the Turkish Grand National Assembly and of the European Parliament.

References

http://www.tbmm.gov.tr/ul_kom/kpk/genelbilgiler.htm
http://www.europarl.europa.eu/delegations/en/d-tr/home.html
https://web.archive.org/web/20121006152644/http://www.abgs.gov.tr/index.php?p=270&l=1
http://www.mfa.gov.tr/turkiye-ab-iliskilerine-genel-bakis.tr.mfa

See also
http://www.europarl.europa.eu/delegations/en/d-tr/publications.html
http://www.europarl.europa.eu/intcoop/euro/jpc/d_tr/default_en.htm
http://www.abgs.gov.tr/index.php?p=271&l=2
Turkey–European Union relations